Strafing is the military practice of attacking ground targets from low-flying aircraft using aircraft-mounted automatic weapons. 
Less commonly, the term is used by extension to describe high-speed firing runs by any land or naval craft such as fast boats, using smaller-caliber weapons and targeting stationary or slowly-moving targets.

Etymology 
The word is an adaptation of German strafen, to punish, specifically from the humorous adaptation of the German anti-British slogan Gott strafe England (May God punish England), dating back to World War I.

Description

Guns used in strafing range in caliber from  machine guns, to  autocannon or rotary cannon. Although ground attack using automatic weapons fire is very often accompanied with bombing or rocket fire, the term "strafing" does not specifically include the last two. 

The term "strafing" can cover either fixed guns, or aimable (flexible) guns. Fixed guns firing directly ahead tend to be more predominant on fixed wing aircraft, while helicopters tend to use gimballed weapons which can be fired in many different directions independent of the direction the aircraft is pointing in (in most cases, flexible guns on a fixed wing aircraft are for defense purposes only, although they can sometimes be used to fire on ground targets to limited effect). 

Some fixed wing aircraft, like fighter-bombers, are capable of flying either air-combat missions or ground attack missions (P-47 Thunderbolt), while others are dedicated ground-attack types (Il-2 Sturmovik). In cases where an aircraft is capable of both types of combat, when it is assigned to a ground attack role, and thus expected to be using the guns mostly for strafing, the fixed weapons are often mounted so that the convergence point is lower and at a greater range than would be used for air combat. This is helpful because it allows the pilot to aim at a target without having to dive towards the ground as steeply, decreasing the risk of collision with the ground and increasing the amount of firing time available before having to pull up, and it also increases the range from the target, helping avoid anti-aircraft fire and potential damage from exploding targets. 

Because of the low altitude and relatively low airspeed required for accurate strafing, it is very risky for the pilot, who is exposed not only to the risk of flight-into-terrain and obstacles such as power lines, but also to anti-aircraft weapons, including surface-to-air missiles (both vehicle mounted and hand-held), anti-aircraft artillery and small caliber weapons fire (such as machine guns and small arms). Planes purposely designed for ground attack may include additional armour around and underneath the cockpit and other vulnerable areas such as engines to protect the pilot and key flight components, while aircraft designed mostly for air combat tend to have most of their armor placed to protect directly ahead or to the rear, where fire from other aircraft is most likely, leaving them more vulnerable to fire from directly below or to the sides, where much ground fire often comes from.

History

World War I

While the earliest use of military aircraft was for observation and directing of artillery, strafing was frequently practised in World War I. Trenches and supply columns were routinely attacked from the air in the second half of the war. Strafing with machine guns was used when precision was needed (facing small targets), but non-strafing attack methods (primarily small bombs) were preferred for larger targets, area targets, or when low-altitude flying was too risky.

The German army was the first to introduce a class of aircraft specially designed for strafing, the ground-attack aircraft. Planes built specifically for strafing include the German World War I Junkers J.I, which was armored to protect it from ground-based gunfire. The Junkers J.I. had two downward-facing machine guns that were used for strafing.

World War II
These developments continued through World War II with dedicated aircraft including the concept of the heavily protected cockpit or "bathtub" to permit the pilot to survive counterfire from anti-aircraft batteries.

The Luftwaffe's best strafing plane was the Junkers Ju 87 Stuka.  The Ju 87 G variant had two Rheinmetall-Borsig  Flak 18 guns each mounted under the wing.

For the RAF, the best ground attack plane was the Hawker Hurricane II.  It was armed with four  wing-mounted cannon. The Hawker Typhoon was used in the later stages of the war. It had four "60 lb" RP-3 rockets.

For the US, the Republic P-47 Thunderbolt was one of the key ground attack planes.  It was armed with eight .50 calibre (12.7 mm) machine guns.  Another aircraft that was important in that role was the North American B-25 Mitchell.  It was used for low-altitude strafing runs in the Pacific War.

The Russian Ilyushin IL-2 Sturmovik was one of the key Russian ground attack planes.  It had heavy armour around the engine, underside and canopy.  It was armed with  cannon, depending on the model.

An RCAF Spitfire of 412 Squadron piloted by Charley Fox strafed the command car of Erwin Rommel on 17 July 1944 near Sainte-Foy-de-Montgommery, affecting his possible participation in the 20 July 1944 Operation Valkyrie coup.

Postwar
In the Korean War (1950–1953), US Air Force planes strafed targets deep behind the front line and had a perceptible impact on the progress of the ground war, but the concept of strafing was already in decline.

In the 1960s, when precision-guided weapons became widespread, strafing temporarily fell out of favor as unnecessarily risky and some American fighter aircraft or attack aircraft (such as the F-4 Phantom and A-6 Intruder) then did not have built-in cannon or machine guns. In the Vietnam War, that was found to be a deficiency, and  improvised "gunships" had to be used in strafing missions. Gunships like the AC-47 Spooky, AC-119 Specter, and early models of the AC-130 Spooky gunship proved to be devastating defenders of besieged US Special Forces camps.

The A-10 Thunderbolt II is an American twin-engine, straight-wing jet aircraft developed by Fairchild-Republic in the early 1970s which is the only United States Air Force aircraft designed solely for close air support of ground forces. The A-10 was built to attack tanks, armored vehicles, and other ground targets with limited air defenses, often through strafing.

The A-10 was designed around the GAU-8 Avenger, a  rotary cannon, which is the airplane's primary armament and the heaviest such automatic cannon mounted on an aircraft. The A-10's official name comes from the Republic P-47 Thunderbolt of World War II, a fighter that was particularly effective at close air support. The A-10 is the main US plane designed to do strafing runs.

Since 2001, Coalition pilots in Iraq and Afghanistan have used strafing runs to support ground forces in areas where explosive ordnance could cause unacceptable civilian casualties. Strafing runs done by F-16s are very risky for the pilot. The cities of Damascus and Aleppo were strafed by helicopter gunships in the Syrian civil war.

In 2004, the United States Air Force accidentally strafed one of its own country's middle schools while training in the strafing of the Little Egg Harbor Intermediate School incident.

See also 
Ground-attack aircraft
Military aviation

References

External links 

AROUND THE WORLD; Manila Acknowledges Strafing Japanese Ship, January 19, 1982, The New York Times.
Major Andrew Duncan DFC, SAAF no. 103023V, Biplane fighter aces : The Commonwealth 16 May 1920 – 31 May 1942, surfcity.kund.dalnet.se
Slaughterhouse Five, November 18, 2009, lettersofnote.com

Aerial warfare tactics
Targeting (warfare)